Presidential elections were held in El Salvador in January 1891. Provisional president General Carlos Ezeta was the only candidate and was elected with only 19 votes against.

Results

References

El Salvador
1890s in El Salvador
Election and referendum articles with incomplete results
Presidential elections in El Salvador
Single-candidate elections